Quxur (also, Quxuroba and Kukhur) is a village in the Qusar Rayon of Azerbaijan.  The village forms part of the municipality of Sudur.

References 

Populated places in Qusar District